James H. Gifford (October 18, 1845 – December 19, 1901) was a manager in Major League Baseball for three seasons from  to . He managed the 1884 Indianapolis Hoosiers, and the New York Metropolitans from  into the 1886 season. He managed a total of 212, and had a career win–loss record of 74–136.

James H. Gifford was a Civil War veteran. A check of the records left no doubt that this was the case. His service record indicated that he enlisted as a Private in the Union Army on October 8, 1862. He enlisted in Warren, New York, which is the birthplace of the manager. He gave his age as 18, which is one year than the listed age of the manager, but such discrepancies were common. He was assigned to Company K of the 152nd New York Infantry and served for nearly three years, eventually being promoted to Full Corporal. He was mustered out in Washington on July 13, 1865. The former manager died in December 1901 in Columbus, Ohio, and his widow Elizabeth filed for a pension on January 16, 1902, citing the name James H. Gifford and his service in Company K of the 152nd New York. 

Born in Warren, New York, Gifford died in Columbus, Ohio at the age of 56, and is interred in Green Lawn Cemetery in Columbus.

References

External links
Baseball-Reference manager page

1845 births
1901 deaths
Indianapolis Hoosiers (AA) managers
New York Metropolitans managers
Minor league baseball managers
Burials at Green Lawn Cemetery (Columbus, Ohio)
Union Army personnel